NGC 7302 is a lenticular galaxy located around 124 million light-years away from Earth in the constellation of Aquarius. NGC 7302 was discovered by British astronomer William Herschel on October 3, 1785 and was rediscovered by American astronomer Lewis Swift on August 8, 1896 and was listed in the IC catalogue as IC 5228. It is also part of a group of interacting galaxies.

See also
 NGC 4036
 NGC 2787

References

External links

Astronomical objects discovered in 1785
Aquarius (constellation)
7302
IC objects
Lenticular galaxies
69094
Unbarred lenticular galaxies